Aa matthewsii is a species of orchid in the genus Aa. It is found in Peru and western Bolivia.

References

matthewsii
Plants described in 1912
Flora of Peru
Flora of Bolivia